Vidal Golosinas is a Spanish manufacturer and marketer of confectionery, specialising in the production of liquorice and gummy candies.

Vidal was founded in 1963 and, after more than 50 years, produces 50 million units a day in more than 60 countries. Vidal produces filled jelly sweets with 3D designs, center filled gummies, pectin-filled sweet foam, chewing gum with a fizzy filling and sugar coated liquorice. Vidal also produces kosher products. Vidal's strongest markets are in the UK, France and Portugal as well as Spain.

Subdivisions 
Relle Nolas
SoftFruit
Dulci Nubes
Melons
Dipper
Zoom
Glas Frut
Rolla Belta
Dulcitar
Dulci Pica
Pompito
Bolitren
Rolling
Pali Pica

International bases 
As well as their base in Murcia, Spain, Vidal also have bases in :
Lisbon, Portugal
Belfort, France
Rome, Italy
Yorkshire, United Kingdom
Tzabei Hanajal, Israel

See also 
Confectionery
List of Spanish companies

References

Companies based in the Region of Murcia
Confectionery companies
Food and drink companies of Spain
Food and drink companies established in 1963
Spanish brands
1963 establishments in Spain